The saguaro (Carnegiea gigantea) is a tree-like cactus species in the monotypic genus Carnegiea that can grow to be over  tall. It is native to the Sonoran Desert in Arizona, the Mexican state of Sonora, and the Whipple Mountains and Imperial County areas of California. The saguaro blossom is the state wildflower of Arizona. Its scientific name is given in honor of Andrew Carnegie. In 1994, Saguaro National Park, near Tucson, Arizona, was designated to help protect this species and its habitat.

Saguaros have a relatively long lifespan, often exceeding 150 years. They may grow their first side arm around 75–100 years of age, but some never grow any arms. Arms are developed to increase the plant's reproductive capacity, as more apices lead to more flowers and fruit. A saguaro can absorb and store considerable amounts of rainwater, visibly expanding in the process, while slowly using the stored water as needed. This characteristic enables the saguaro to survive during periods of drought. It is a keystone species, and provides food and habitat to a large number of species.

Saguaros have been a source of food and shelter for humans for thousands of years. Their sweet red fleshed fruits are turned into syrup by native peoples, such as the Tohono Oʼodham and Pima. Their ribs are used as building materials in the wood-poor deserts. The saguaro cactus is a common image in Mexican and Arizonan culture, and American Southwest films.

Description 
The saguaro is a columnar cactus that grows notable branches, usually referred to as arms. Over 50 arms may grow on one plant, with one specimen having 78 arms. They are slow growing, but routinely live 150 to 200 years. They are the largest cactus in the United States.

The growth rate of this cactus is strongly dependent on precipitation; saguaros in drier western Arizona grow only half as fast as those in and around Tucson. The tallest saguaro ever measured was an armless specimen found near Cave Creek, Arizona.

Individual stomatal guard cells and medulla cells can live and function for as long as 150 years, possibly the longest living of all cells, except possibly nerve cells in some tortoises.

As a cactus, it uses crassulacean acid metabolism photosynthesis, which confers high levels of water-use efficiency. This allows the saguaro to only transpire at night, minimizing daytime water loss.

A saguaro without arms is called a "spear".

Some saguaros grow in rare formations called a cristate, or "crested" saguaro. This growth formation is believed to be found in one in roughly 10,000 saguaros, with 2743 known crested saguaros documented. The crest formation, caused by fasciation, creates a seam of abnormal growth along the top or top of the arm of the saguaro.

Ribs
Inside the saguaro, many "ribs" of wood form something like a skeleton, with the individual ribs being as long as the cactus itself and up to a few centimeters in diameter. While the ribs of dead plants are not protected by the Arizona native plant law, the Arizona Department of Agriculture has released a memo discussing when written permission is needed before harvesting them because of the importance of the decomposition of cactus remains in maintaining desert soil fertility.

The composition of the ribs is similar to that of hardwoods.

Spines

When held up to the light or bisected, alternating light and dark bands transverse to the long axis of spines are visible. These bands have been correlated to daily growth. In columnar cacti, spines almost always grow in areoles that originate at the apex of the plant. A spine stops growing in its first season. Areoles are moved to the side and the apex continues to grow upward. Thus, older spines are toward the base of a columnar cactus and newer spines are near the apex. Studies are underway to examine the relationship of carbon and oxygen isotope ratios in the tissues of spines of an individual to its climate and photosynthetic history (acanthochronology).

The spines may cause significant injury to animals; one paper reported that a bighorn sheep skull had been penetrated by a saguaro spine after the sheep collided with a saguaro. They can also cause severe injury to humans, being as sharp and nearly as strong as steel needles. Their long, unbarbed nature means that partially embedded spines can be easily removed, but their relative length can complicate injuries. The spines can puncture deeply, and if broken off, can leave splinters of spine deep in the tissue that can be difficult to remove. Fully embedded spikes are also difficult to remove. Such injuries do not usually result in infection, though, as the cactus spines are generally aseptic. However, spines that remain embedded may cause inflammatory granuloma.

Flowers

The white, waxy flowers appear in April through June, opening well after sunset and closing in midafternoon. They continue to produce nectar after sunrise. Flowers are self-incompatible, thus requiring cross-pollination. Large quantities of pollen are required for complete pollination because many ovules are present. This pollen is produced by the extremely numerous stamens, which in one notable case totaled 3,482 in a single flower. A well-pollinated fruit contains several thousand tiny seeds.

Pollination is considered relatively generalized in that multiple species can produce effective pollination when some populations are excluded. Main pollinators are honey bees, bats, and white-winged doves. In most, but not all studies, diurnal pollinators contributed more than nocturnal ones. Honey bees were the greatest contributors. Other diurnal pollinators are birds such as Costa's hummingbird, the black-chinned hummingbird, the broad-billed hummingbird, the hooded oriole, Scott's oriole, the Gila woodpecker, the gilded flicker, the verdin, and the house finch according to studies that examined the relative contributions of diurnal pollinators.

The primary nocturnal pollinator is the lesser long-nosed bat, feeding on the nectar. Several floral characteristics are geared toward bat pollination (chiropterophily): nocturnal opening of the flowers, nocturnal maturation of pollen, very rich nectar, position high above ground, durable blooms that can withstand a bat's weight, and fragrance emitted at night. Claw marks on the flower indicate pollination by a bat.

Since they form only at the top of the plant and the tips of branches, saguaros growing numerous branches is reproductively advantageous. Flowers open sequentially, with plants averaging four open flowers a day over a bloom period lasting a month. In Southern Arizona, saguaros begin flowering around May 3 and peak on June 4. A decline in bat populations causes more daytime flower openings, which favors other pollinators.

Fruit

This pole is used to hook the fruits or knock them free.

Saguaro seeds are small and short-lived. Although they germinate easily, predation and lack of moisture prevent all but about 1% of seeds from successful germination. Seeds must wait 1214 months before germination; lack of water during this period drastically reduces seedling survival. The existence of nurse plants is critical to seedling establishment. Palo verde trees and triangle bursage represent important nurse species. They act by regulating temperature extremes, increasing soil nutrients, and reducing evapotranspiration, among others.

Native American Indians of the Southwest would make bread from the ground seeds of saguaro.

Genome
The saguaro genome is around 1 billion base pairs long. Sequencing has revealed that the genome of the saguaro's chloroplast is the smallest known among nonparasitic flowering plants. Like several other highly specialized plant taxa, such as the carnivorous Genlisea and parasitic Cuscuta, the saguaro has lost the ndh plastid genes, which codes for production of NADPH dehydrogenase pathway, but unlike those taxa, the saguaro remains fully autotrophic; i.e. it does not eat or steal part of its food. The saguaro is remarkable for the scale and completeness of gene loss; essentially no traces of the 11 ndh genes remain in the plastid. The genes appear to have been copied to the nuclear DNA and mitochondrial DNA, but those copies are non-functional. How the saguaro thrives in a high stress environment without working copies of this fairly important gene remains unknown, but it is possible that the functions of the ndh genes have been taken on by another pathway.

Taxonomy 
Carnegiea gigantea is the only species in the monotypic genus Carnegiea. The first description of the species was made by William H. Emory in 1848, during his surveys along the pre-Gadsden Purchase United States-Mexican border. This description allowed cactus expert George Engelmann to formally name it, during his work on the United States and Mexican Boundary Survey, published in 1859. The next major taxonomic treatment came from The Cactaceae, the seminal work on cactus by Nathaniel Lord Britton and Joseph Nelson Rose.

What tribe Carnegiea gigantea belongs to is a matter of taxonomic dispute. A molecular analysis of the cactus family in 2010 placed the saguaro in the Echinocereinae. The ARS Germplasm Resources Information Network places it in the Echinocereeae.

The generic name honors businessman and philanthropist Andrew Carnegie. The specific epithet gigantea refers to its formidable size.

Distribution and habitat

Saguaros are endemic to the Sonoran Desert and are found primarily in western Sonora in Mexico, and in southern and portions of western Arizona in the US. There are only 30 known wild plants found in southeastern California. Elevation is a limiting factor to its environment, as the saguaro is sensitive to extended frost or cold temperatures. No confirmed specimens of wild saguaros have been found anywhere in Nevada, New Mexico, Texas, Colorado, Utah, nor in the high deserts of northern Arizona. The northern limits of their range are the Hualapai Mountains in Arizona. They are the northernmost columnar cacti in the Americas.

Ecology 
The saguaro is a keystone species, and provides food, shelter, and protection to hundreds of other species. Every stage of the saguaro's life sustains a significant number of species, from seedling to after its death.

As food 
The saguaro provides voluminous amounts of pollen, nectar, and fruits. The fruits are eaten by the white-winged dove and ants, so that seeds rarely escape to germinate. White-winged doves are important pollinators, visiting blooms more often than any other bird species. For desert white-winged doves, 60% or more of their diet is saguaro-based. Their breeding cycle coincides with that of the saguaro blooming.

Nests
Gila woodpeckers and gilded flickers create holes in the cactus to make nests, which are later used by other birds, such as elf owls, purple martins, and house finches. Gilded flickers excavate larger holes higher on the stem compared to Gila woodpeckers. The resulting nest cavity is deep, and the parents and young are entirely hidden from view. The saguaro creates callus tissue on the wound. When the saguaro dies and its soft flesh rots, the callus remains as a so-called saguaro boot, which was used by natives for storage.

Gila woodpeckers (Melanerpes uropygialis) create new nest holes each season rather than reuse the old ones, leaving convenient nest holes for other birds, such as elf owls, tyrant flycatchers, and wrens. In recent years, early-breeding aggressive non-native birds have taken over the nests, to the detriment of elf owls that breed and nest later. In 2020, a bald eagle was found nesting in a saguaro for the first time since 1937.

Conservation

Harming or vandalizing a saguaro in any manner, such as shooting them (sometimes known as "cactus plugging") is illegal by state law in Arizona. When houses or highways are built, special permits must be obtained to move or destroy any saguaro affected. This is common when the cactus falls over in a storm, its location interferes with a house addition, or it becomes a potential hazard to humans.

In 1982, a man was killed after damaging a saguaro. David Grundman was shooting and poking at a saguaro cactus in an effort to make it fall. An arm of the cactus, weighing , fell onto him, crushing him and his car. The trunk of the cactus then also fell on him. The Austin Lounge Lizards wrote the song "Saguaro" about this death.

Contrary to published statements, no law mandates prison sentences of 25 years for cutting a cactus down; however, it is considered a class-four felony with a possible 3-year, 9-month maximum sentence.

Invasive species, such as buffelgrass and Sahara mustard, pose significant threats to the Sonoran Desert ecosystem by increasing the rate of fires. Buffelgrass outcompetes saguaros for water, and grows densely. It is also extremely flammable, but survives fire easily due to deep root systems. Saguaros did not evolve in an environment with frequent fires, thus are not adapted to fire survival. Most Sonoran desert ecosystems have a fire return interval greater than 250 years; buffelgrass thrives at fire return intervals of two to three years. This has led to the reshaping of the Sonoran Desert ecosystem and threatens the survival of the saguaro.

Climate change may threaten saguaros and their ecosystems, as deserts are particularly susceptible to climate effects. Rising daytime and nighttime temperatures will reduce the water use efficiency of saguaros, forcing them to use more water and making them more likely to die during drought periods.

Uses

Ethnobotany
The utility of the saguaro is well known to Native Americans such as the Tohono Oʼodham, Pima, and Seri peoples, who still use nearly every part of the plant. The fruit and seeds are edible, being consumed fresh and dried, and made it into preserves and drinks. The Tohono O'odham use long sticks to harvest the fruits, which are then made into a variety of products including jams, syrups, and wine. The Tohono O'odham begin their harvest in June. Copious volumes of fruit are harvested; an example harvest in 1929 yielded  among 600 families. At the end of the harvest, each family would contribute a small amount of syrup to a communal stock that would be fermented by the medicine man. This was cause for rainmaking celebrations. Stories would be told, there was much dancing, and songs would be sung. Each man would drink some of the saguaro wine. The resulting intoxicated state was seen as holy, and any dreams it brought on were considered portentous.

The seeds are ground into meal or eaten raw, but the raw seeds are mostly indigestible. They are also pressed for their oils. They also have minor use in the tanning of leather. In modern times, these uses have declined, and the seeds are now mainly used as chicken feed.

The ribs of the dead saguaro were used for construction and other purposes by Native Americans. The Tohono O'odham use it for making fences and furniture. The ribs are also used as livestock fodder.

A variety of alkaloids, including carnegine, gigantine, and salsolidine, make the stems quite bitter, and an unpalatable way to gain water.

Reports of saguaro use date back to the Coronado expeditions of 1540–1542, which noted its use in winemaking.

The old bird nests resist the elements and are gathered by Native Americans for use as storage vessels. Cactus boots, excavated by gilded flickers and taken from dead saguaros, have been used by native peoples as water containers.

The saguaro features prominently in indigenous folklore and religions.

Culture
Arizona made the saguaro blossom its territorial flower on March 13, 1901, and on March 16, 1931, it became the state flower.

The saguaro is often used as an emblem in commercials and logos that attempt to convey a sense of the Southwest. Notably, no naturally occurring saguaros are found within  of El Paso, Texas, but the silhouette is found on the label of Old El Paso brand products. Though the geographic anomaly has lessened in recent years, Western films once enthusiastically placed saguaros in the Monument Valley of Arizona, (they only grow naturally in the Sonoran desert of Arizona and Mexico) as well as New Mexico, Utah, and Texas. The Dallas, Texas-based band Reverend Horton Heat pokes fun at this phenomenon in their song "Ain't no Saguaro in Texas."

Gallery

References

Further reading
 Benson, L. (1981). The Cacti of Arizona. University of Arizona Press. .
 Drezner TD (2005) Saguaro (Carnegiea gigantea, Cactaceae) growth rate over its American range and the link to summer precipitation. Southwest Nat 50:65–68.

External links

 Flora of North America: Carnegiea gigantea
 Jepson Flora Project: Carnegiea gigantea
 Calphotos: Carnegiea gigantea
 USDA Plants Profile: Carnegiea gigantea
 SaguaroCactus.org

Cacti of Mexico
Cacti of the United States
Flora of the Sonoran Deserts
Flora of Arizona
Flora of Sonora
Flora of the California desert regions
Flora of Northwestern Mexico
Flora of the Southwestern United States
North American desert flora
Natural history of the Colorado Desert
Least concern flora of North America
Least concern flora of the United States
Plants used in Native American cuisine
Plants used in traditional Native American medicine
Desert fruits
Edible plants
Garden plants of North America
Drought-tolerant plants
Arizona culture